The Mini All4 Racing is an off-road competition car, built by X-raid between 2011 and 2016, specially designed to take part in the rally raids with the main objective of winning the Dakar Rally. In 2017 Mini All4 Racing was succeeded by Mini John Cooper Works Rally.

Dakar victories

Other victories
 2013 Rallye du Maroc (Orlando Terranova and Paulo Fuiza)
 2014 Rallye du Maroc (Nasser Al-Attiyah and Mathieu Baumel)
 2015 Rallye du Maroc (Nasser Al-Attiyah and Mathieu Baumel)
 2018 Silk Way Rally (Yazeed Al Rajhi, Timo Gottschalk)

See also
Mini
Mini Countryman
Mini John Cooper Works WRC
 X-raid

References

External links
 Mini Cooper Countryman ALL4 Racing Dakar Rally Car

Rally cars
Rally raid cars
Dakar Rally winning cars
Mini (BMW) vehicles